Elections to the municipal council of Nájera, La Rioja, Spain.

May 2003

June 1999

May 1995

May 1991

June 1987

Source: 

Municipal elections in Spain